Haywards 5000 Mr India World was held on March 7, 2007. Kawaljit Anand Singh was named Mr India world 2007. Freddy Daruwalla became 1st Runner Up and Mohsin Akhtar became 2nd Runner Up.

Results 
Color key

Special awards

Judges
 Hemant Trivedi
 Rocky S
 Shaina NC
 Subi Samuel
 Dipnnita Sharma

References

2007 beauty pageants
Beauty pageants in India